

Results

Up to 105 kg (Men)

Up to 69 kg (Women)

58 kg (Women)

85 kg (Men)

94 kg (Men)

63 kg (Women)

56 kg (Men)

69 kg (Men)

48 kg (Women)

53 kg (Women)

77 kg (Men)

References 

2003 in African sport
2003 in Asian sport
2003 in Indian sport